Judith Lynne Brown Clarke (née Brown, formerly Brown-King, born July 14, 1961) is an American politician and former athlete who competed mainly in the 400 metre hurdles. She is the 1984 Olympic silver medalist and two-time Pan American Games champion. She later was a member of the Lansing, Michigan City Council.

Sports career
Born in Milwaukee, Wisconsin, Clarke (under the name Judi Brown) won the gold medal in the 400m hurdles at the 1983 Pan American Games, narrowly ahead of her team-mate Sharrieffa Barksdale. In 1984, she won her first US national 400m hurdles title before going on to win the silver medal in the event at the 1984 Summer Olympics in Los Angeles, finishing behind Nawal El Moutawakel. Under her then married name of Judi Brown King, she won three more US 400m hurdles titles from 1985 to 1987 and successfully defended her Pan American Games title in 1987, finishing ahead of Sandra Farmer. She was also a twelve-time Big Ten champion in track and field events during her career. In 1987, she was selected Sportsman of the Year by Sports Illustrated magazine for her community involvement.

Education
Clarke holds two degrees from Michigan State University, a Bachelor's degree in Audiology and Speech Science, and a Master's degree in Education.  She was inducted into the Michigan State University Hall of Fame in 1986.  She holds a Ph.D. in Public Administration and Public Policy from Western Michigan University, from which she graduated with honors. She also is a member of the Michigan Even Start Statewide Family Literacy Consortium.

Political career
Clarke was elected to the Lansing, Michigan City Council in 2013 and remained in office until 2017, and unsuccessfully ran for mayor of Lansing in the 2017 election.

International competitions
All results regarding 400m hurdles

References

Notes
 
 USATF 400 Hurdles list
 USATF Olympic Trials Champions

1961 births
Living people
People from East Lansing, Michigan
American female hurdlers
Athletes (track and field) at the 1984 Summer Olympics
Athletes (track and field) at the 1983 Pan American Games
Athletes (track and field) at the 1987 Pan American Games
Olympic silver medalists for the United States in track and field
Michigan State University alumni
Western Michigan University alumni
Medalists at the 1984 Summer Olympics
Pan American Games gold medalists for the United States
Pan American Games medalists in athletics (track and field)
Politicians from Lansing, Michigan
21st-century American women politicians
21st-century American politicians
Big Ten Athlete of the Year winners
Competitors at the 1986 Goodwill Games
Medalists at the 1983 Pan American Games
Medalists at the 1987 Pan American Games
Michigan State Spartans women's track and field athletes